Deji Aliu (born 22 November 1975 in Lagos) is a Nigerian sprinter. He won the 100 metres event at the 2003 All-Africa Games. He also took fourth place in the event at the 2002 Commonwealth Games.

Aliu formed part of the Nigerian relay team which won a bronze medal at the 2004 Olympics. Together with Innocent Asonze, Francis Obikwelu and Daniel Effiong . He won a bronze medal in 4 x 100 metres relay at the 1999 World Championships in Athletics, but the team was later disqualified (in August 2005) because Innocent Asonze failed a doping test in June 1999.

Personal bests 
 100 metres – 9.95 (2003)
 200 metres – 20.25 (2002)

External links 
 
 
 

1975 births
Living people
Yoruba sportspeople
Nigerian male sprinters
Athletes (track and field) at the 1994 Commonwealth Games
Athletes (track and field) at the 1996 Summer Olympics
Athletes (track and field) at the 2000 Summer Olympics
Athletes (track and field) at the 2002 Commonwealth Games
Athletes (track and field) at the 2004 Summer Olympics
Athletes (track and field) at the 2006 Commonwealth Games
Commonwealth Games competitors for Nigeria
Olympic athletes of Nigeria
Olympic bronze medalists for Nigeria
Medalists at the 2004 Summer Olympics
Sportspeople from Lagos
Olympic bronze medalists in athletics (track and field)
African Games gold medalists for Nigeria
African Games medalists in athletics (track and field)
World Athletics Championships athletes for Nigeria
Athletes (track and field) at the 2003 All-Africa Games